Tamien station is an intermodal passenger transportation station in the Tamien neighborhood of central San Jose, California, served by the VTA light rail and the Caltrain commuter rail line, along with bus connections. The station has two elevated island platforms, one for each service. The two platforms are connected by a walkway at ground-level that is below the two platforms. The light rail platform is located in the center median of the State Route 87 freeway just north of the Alma Avenue overpass.  The Caltrain platform is located between Lick Avenue and State Route 87, just north of Alma Avenue.

The station is served by the Blue Line of the VTA Light Rail system and is connected to the Highway 87 Bikeway.

The station is named after the Tamien (also spelled Tamyen) who are some of the Ohlone, a Native American people.

History
The light rail station opened on August 17, 1990. Caltrain service began on July 1, 1992 as part of an extension to Gilroy station.

Midday and weekend Caltrain service initially terminated at San Jose Diridon station, with bus shuttles to Tamien station. Weekend service and some off-peak service was extended to Tamien on December 14, 2020, eliminating the shuttles.

Caltrain is set to be electrified from San Francisco to Tamien by 2024. Services to Gilroy, beyond Tamien, will remain diesel-propelled.

References

External links

Station information (Caltrain)
Station information (VTA)

Caltrain stations in Santa Clara County, California
Santa Clara Valley Transportation Authority light rail stations
Santa Clara Valley Transportation Authority bus stations
Railway stations in San Jose, California
Railway stations in the United States opened in 1990
Future Amtrak stations in the United States
1990 establishments in California
Railway stations in highway medians